Maximilien Charles Alphonse Cerfberr of Medelsheim (20 July 1817, Epinal – 16 December 1883, Paris) was a French journalist, writer and governmental official.

After traveling extensively in Algeria and the East, Cerfberr was attached in 1839 to the penitentiary administration in the Ministry of the Interior. In 1848 he held for a short time the position of commissary of the Republic in the Department of Saône-et-Loire.

Among Cerfberr's numerous writings the most noteworthy are:

Projet d'un Etablissement Pénitencier à Paris, 1841
La Vérité sur les Prisons, 1844
Le Silence en Prison, Réflexions d'un Condamné, 1847
Ce Que Sont les Juifs en France, 1843
Les Juifs, Leurs Histoire, Leurs Mœurs, 1846
La Guyane, Civilisation et Barbarie, Coutumes et Usages, 1854
Paraboles, 1854
La Police d'Assurance, 1867
L'Epargne par la Dépense, 1867
Biographie Alsacienne, 1878
Histoire d'un Village, 1881
L'Architecture en France, 1883

Cerfberr wrote on several other subjects of less importance; and he translated several works from German into French.

Bibliography
Larousse Dictionnaire xvii. (2d Supplement), p. 761
La Grande Encyclopédie, x. 50

1817 births
1883 deaths
People from Épinal
19th-century French Jews
19th-century French journalists
French male journalists
19th-century French male writers